Allium cuthbertii, common name striped garlic, is a plant species native to the southeastern United States. It occurs at elevations less than 300 m in Alabama, Georgia, North and South Carolina, and northeastern Florida. It is a perennial herb.

Allium cuthbertii produces egg-shaped bulbs up to 2 cm long. Scapes are round, triangular or square in cross-section, up to 40 cm tall. Flowers are about 8 mm across, white, pink or purple; anthers and pollen yellow.

References

cuthbertii
Endemic flora of the United States
Flora of the Southeastern United States
Plants described in 1903
Taxa named by John Kunkel Small